is a town located in Miyako District, Fukuoka Prefecture, on the Japanese home island of Kyushu, which is one of  the four main islands. Kanda is a suburb of the city of Kitakyushu.

As of April 30, 2017, the town has an estimated population of 36,957 and a density of 800 persons per km2. The total area is 46.46 km2.

Nishinippon Institute of Technology is located in the town.

Future merger
A majority of local residents favor remaining an independent municipality, but voices calling for a merger with the neighboring city of Kitakyūshū remain.

Transportation
The town is located approximately 5 miles  (8 kilometers) west of Kitakyūshū Airport, which is built on an artificial island. The airport serves several major cities in Japan and other eastern Asian countries. By road, the city is adjacent to the Higashi-Kyushu Expressway. By rail, the city is served by the Kanda Station.

Economy
The Nissan Motor Kyushu factory started operation in Kanda in 1975.

Culture
The Kanda Float Festival is held annually in mid-September. The festival is famous for its 14 "fighting floats", and has been categorized as an "Intengible Folk Cultural Asset" by the Fukuoka prefecture.

Sister Cities
 Samcheok, South Korea (since 1997)

References

External links

Kanda official website 

Towns in Fukuoka Prefecture
Port settlements in Japan